The 2020 Liga 1, also known as Shopee Liga 1 for sponsorship reasons, was the fourth season of Liga 1 under its current name and the 11th season of the top-flight Indonesian professional league for association football clubs since its establishment in 2008. The season started on 29 February 2020 and was suspended on 16 March 2020 due to the COVID-19 pandemic. The season was abandoned and declared void on 20 January 2021.

Bali United were the defending champions. Persik, Persita, and Persiraja joined as the promoted teams from the 2019 Liga 2. They replace Badak Lampung, Kalteng Putra, and Semen Padang who were relegated to the 2020 Liga 2.

Effects of the COVID-19 pandemic 
The season was first suspended on 15 March 2020 after finishing matchday three amid increasing contagion risks from the COVID-19 pandemic. The initial plan was the suspension would end in late March. However, the suspension was extended to 29 May 2020 due to government restrictions on social gatherings.

On 27 June 2020, the Indonesian football association, PSSI, announced it would resume Liga 1 from October 2020. League organizer PT Liga Indonesia Baru (LIB) followed it up by announcing matchday four would be held on 1 October 2020 and the season would end on 28 February 2021, but with a note that this tentative schedule would need approval from authorities related to the management of the COVID-19 pandemic. The plan was to hold all matches without spectators and have no changes to the double round-robin format. Organizers were prepared to hold all matches on the main island of Java, where most teams are based, to mitigate contagion risks. Teams from outside Java and the capital Jakarta, which had the highest infection risks in the country, would be based in Yogyakarta, where the pandemic was relatively under control.

In a 17 July 2020 meeting, all teams agreed on further details for the resumption plan, including increasing substitutions from three to five, in line with a proposal by FIFA to lessen the impact of fixture congestion. The meeting also agreed that there would be no relegation and all teams must have a minimum of two U-20 local players. To mitigate infection risks, each team must conduct a swab test before the resumption and a rapid test every 14 days during the competition with LIB in charge of testing the day before matchday. LIB also would allow mid-season transfers between 21 September – 18 October 2020 but the transfers would not be recorded at FIFA Transfer Match System (TMS) to avoid conflict with FIFA regulations. 

The plan began to crumble in September. On 29 September 2020, PSSI postponed the resumption of Liga 1 and Liga 2 for a month after failing to obtain permission from the police on fears that unruly fans would crowd outside the stadiums. After a month, on 29 October 2020, PSSI announced police had not changed their mind and declared the competition could not be held in 2020.

In November 2020, LIB made another attempt to resume the 2020 season in February 2021 with a plan to finish in July 2021. Police also blocked this plan. Eventually, on 15 January 2021, PSSI dismissed the 2020 season of Liga 1 and Liga 2 football leagues and declared them void of winners, relegations and promotions. Any resumption of professional football will be considered as a fresh start of a season. 

The inability to finish the 2020 season impacted Indonesia's participation in the 2021 AFC Cup competition. Representatives had to be determined by the results of the previous domestic season. Bali United, the 2019 Liga 1 champions, was appointed as the first representative. The second appointment was not as straightforward. PSM, the 2018–19 Piala Indonesia winners, should have taken the spot but they failed to obtain an AFC license that is required for the hosting of an AFC match. The next on the pecking order was Persebaya, the 2019 Liga 1 runner-up, but they also missed the AFC hosting qualifications. As a result, Persipura, the league third place, qualified to take the second AFC Cup slot for Indonesia.

Teams 
Eighteen teams competed in the league – the top fifteen teams from the previous season and the three teams promoted from the Liga 2. The new teams this season were Persik, Persita, and Persiraja, who replaced Badak Lampung, Kalteng Putra, and Semen Padang.

Name changes 
 TIRA-Persikabo were renamed to Persikabo 1973, but the name would be used starting next season.
 Bhayangkara relocated to Surakarta and were renamed Bhayangkara Solo.

Stadiums and locations 

Notes:

Personnel and kits 
Note: Flags indicate national team as has been defined under FIFA eligibility rules. Players and coaches may hold more than one non-FIFA nationality.

Notes:

 On the front of shirt.
 On the back of shirt.
 On the sleeves.
 On the shorts.
Additionally, SPECS made referee kits and also supplied the match ball, the Illuzion II.

Apparel changes:

Coaching changes

Foreign players 
Football Association of Indonesia restricted the number of foreign players to four per team, including one slot for a player from AFC countries. Teams can use all the foreign players at once.
 Players name in bold indicates the player was registered during the mid-season transfer window.
 Former Player(s) were players that out of squad or left club within the season, after pre-season transfer window, or in the mid-season transfer window, and at least had one appearance.

Source: First transfer window

Notes:

League table

Results

Season statistics

Top goalscorers

Discipline 

 Most yellow card(s): 2
 17 players
 Most red card(s): 1
  Jonathan Bauman (Arema)
  Gabriel do Carmo (Persela)
  Ante Bakmaz (Persik)
  Andri Ibo (Persik)
  Arthur Cunha (Persipura)
  Feri Komul (Persiraja)
  Finky Pasamba (PSIS)
  Safrudin Tahar (PSIS)
  Derry Rachman (PSS)

Attendances

See also 
 2020 Liga 2
 2020 Liga 3
 2020 Piala Indonesia

References

External links 
 

 
Liga 1 seasons
Liga 1
Liga 1
Indonesia
Liga 1